A Slice of Life is a 1914 American silent short drama film directed by Henry Otto,  starring Ed Coxen, Charlotte Burton, and Winifred Greenwood.

Cast
 Ed Coxen as Jim
 Charlotte Burton as Jessie, Jim's wife
 Winifred Greenwood as Betty Moore
 Edith Borella as Betty's mother
 William Bertram as Long, City Editor
 George Field as Boyd Harte
 John Steppling as Tom, chief of police
 Perry Banks as Police Sergeant
 Albert Cavens

References

External links

1914 films
1914 drama films
Silent American drama films
American silent short films
American black-and-white films
1914 short films
Films directed by Henry Otto
1910s American films